Nikiforovskaya is a rural locality (a village) and the administrative center of Fedorogorskoye Rural Settlement of Shenkursky District, Arkhangelsk Oblast, Russia. The population was 687 as of 2010. There are 14 streets.

Geography 
It is located 3 km east from Shenkursk.

References 

Rural localities in Shenkursky District